Stanislav Kolář (31 March 1912 – 6 May 2003) was a male former international table tennis player from Czechoslovakia.

Table tennis career
From 1931 to 1938 he won sixteen medals in singles, doubles, and team events in the World Table Tennis Championships

The sixteen medals included two gold medals in the men's singles at the 1936 World Table Tennis Championships and men's team event at the 1932 World Table Tennis Championships.

See also
 List of table tennis players
 List of World Table Tennis Championships medalists

References

  Stolní tenis nebo ping-pong

1912 births
2003 deaths
Czech male table tennis players
Czechoslovak table tennis players